This article lists political parties in Sint Eustatius. Sint Eustatius has a multi-party system with few political parties.

Parties

Active Parties
Democratic Party (DP)
Progressive Labour Party (PLP)
Statia’s Liberal Action Movement (SLAM)
St. Eustatius Empowerment Party (STEP)
United People's Coalition (UPC)

Defunct Parties
Sint Eustatius Alliance (SEA)
Windward Islands People's Movement (WIPM) - no longer active in Sint Eustatius. Still active in Saba.

References

See also
 List of political parties by country

 
+Sint Eustatius
Sint Eustatius